Michael Mulgrew is the fifth President of the United Federation of Teachers, the trade union of teachers in New York City, New York. The union's executive board elected Mulgrew in July 2009. Prior to his current position, Michael was elected Vice President for Career and Technical Education (CTE) High Schools in 2005 and became the union’s Chief Operating Officer in 2008.

In an article in City Hall News in July 2009, Mulgrew talked about his strong belief in collaboration with parents, saying, ”I always like to keep up community involvement, working with parents and advocating for students. We do a lot of that now and that’s what we need to do more of, to help the schools that are struggling and to figure out ways the UFT can support and help them.”

Early life and teaching career 
Mulgrew was born on Staten Island, New York in 1965. He attended Roman Catholic schools; and he graduated from the City University of New York system (College of Staten Island) with a BA in English literature and a minor in psychology. At one time, he apprenticed and worked as a carpenter.

Mulgrew began his teaching career working as a substitute teacher at South Richmond High School IS/PS 25 on Staten Island, a District 75 school. He became a full-time teacher at William E. Grady Career and Technical Education High School, a vocational school in Brooklyn, New York in 1993. He held his first UFT office, as chapter leader at the high school in 1999, and helped win the Grady High School UFT chapter a Trachtenberg Award for its strength and unity in 2002.

School budget fights 
Mulgrew was often the public face of the UFT during 2008 and 2009 when the union joined with advocates, community groups and other unions to fight for more school funding. In 2008, the UFT helped form a coalition called "Keep The Promises". The coalition held dozens of rallies and other events around the city until eventually $129 million in education funding was restored to the City budget.

In February 2009, Mulgrew organized a bus caravan of teachers to Washington DC to fight for federal stimulus money for schools and also organized leafleting and phone banks in advance of a massive union rally at New York's City Hall on March 5, 2009. Mulgrew served as emcee of that rally

Closing of "rubber rooms" 
On April 15, 2010, the United Federation of Teachers, Mulgrew, and Mayor Michael Bloomberg announced an agreement to close temporary reassignment centers (TRCs), also known as "rubber rooms", where the Department of Education sent teachers and other employees who were being investigated or going through a hearing process.

However, the elimination of the rubber rooms by the UFT and Mayor Michael Bloomberg in 2010 in the public eye did not solve the issue of employees of the school system removed for various reasons, who continue to remain sitting in various school offices, school buildings and borough offices throughout New York City after being removed from their positions pending the results of their hearings, or not.

Elections
He was appointed to the presidency in 2009 by the union's executive board. He was the only candidate offered in the vote. He was elected by 91 percent of the union members in April 2010.

Contract proposal including retroactive pay 
The contract to be presented by Mulgrew and the UFT to its members for vote in May 2014 included retroactive pay to be paid between 2015 and 2020, which some media sources argued the city could not afford because the money was needed for essential services.

Controversial stance regarding ATR teachers 
The Absent Teacher Reserve, numbering over 1200 teachers in the spring of 2013 and still rising in number due to ongoing school closings the UFT cannot stop, was created as a place for teachers who have lost their positions due to school phase-outs and closings, teaching license elimination and other reasons, continues to be a place where senior teachers from schools closed in favor of new schools and charter schools get sent.

The UFT contract proposal in 2014 negotiated by Mulgrew included a two-year pilot program in which teachers in the Absent Teacher Reserve would be sent out on interviews from September 15 to October 15. Any New York City teacher on ATR status declining or ignoring two official interviews would be considered to have voluntarily resigned and terminated from the system without due process rights. Nonetheless, the UFT claimed on its website the ATR teacher would not lose due-process rights under the contract proposal. Some educators fear the New York City Department of Education, if allowed to violate rights of due process unchecked in this fashion, could next go after regular teachers without due process in similar fashion.

In addition, the UFT contract proposal in 2014 would force ATR teachers after October 15 to accept a temporary provisional assignment. Two consecutive removals for what Mulgrew terms "problematic behavior" within a school year or in successive years would cause the ATR teacher to be removed in an expedited one-day "3020-a" procedure for termination. ATR teachers previously removed on 3020-a charges would remain in the ATR rotation from school to school in a district, but could still be placed in a school.

On May 12, 2014, Michael Mulgrew acknowledged the new contract proposal left undefined the definition of "problematic behavior", and said a panel of hearing officers would solidify the definition of problematic behavior. "If someone says a teacher is screaming in the hallway, that's a problem," he said. "If you do that once, you should be written up. If you do that again you should go through an expedited hearing process."

The statement assumes the truth of any allegation. A fundamental part of due process and 3020-a hearings was that charged teachers possessed the right to cross-examine witnesses against them and present a defense. The new contract proposal would limit the ATR teacher's right of due process.

Proposed creation of teacher career ladder 
For the first time in a public American educational institution, the United Federation of Teachers, in its 2014 contract proposal, in conjunction with New York City Schools Chancellor Carmen Farina, would create a career ladder whereby teachers will be grouped by different level of rights and importance. These include: teacher ambassador; master teacher; teacher ambassador; appointed teacher and tenured teacher; excessed teacher in the Absent Teacher Reserve found guilty of 3020-a offense; teacher in the Absent Teacher Reserve; and substitute teacher.

Notes

American trade union leaders
Schoolteachers from New York (state)
People from Staten Island
Living people
Activists from New York (state)
Educators from New York City
College of Staten Island alumni
Year of birth missing (living people)